Dale Sheltrown is a Democratic politician from Michigan who served in the Michigan House of Representatives from 1999 to 2004, when he was succeeded by his brother Joel Sheltrown.

Sheltrown's father, Ed, was a township supervisor for 35 years, and two of his five siblings are also elected officials or public servants. He operated a farm from 1965 to 1974, and, after two years working in sales at a John Deere dealership, Sheltrown began a career in real estate.

References

1940 births
Living people
County commissioners in Michigan
Democratic Party members of the Michigan House of Representatives
20th-century American politicians
21st-century American politicians